Offerton is an electoral ward in the Metropolitan Borough of Stockport. It elects three Councillors to Stockport Metropolitan Borough Council using the first-past-the-post electoral method, electing one Councillor every year without election on the fourth.

Together with Bredbury and Woodley, Bredbury Green and Romiley, Hazel Grove, Marple North, and Marple South it constitutes the Hazel Grove Parliamentary constituency. Offerton Ward was home to the former Offerton High School. Offerton Ward is located near the centre of the borough and is bordered by Marple South, Marple North, Bredbury Green & Romiley, Manor, Stepping Hill and Hazel Grove. The ward was also the seat of former Council Leader Dave Goddard, who in 2012 lost his seat to Laura Booth of the Labour Party, who has since become a Lib Dem. Goddard has since been re-elected for Offerton but is not standing for Leader of the Council.

Councillors
Offerton electoral ward is represented in Westminster by William Wragg MP for Hazel Grove.

The ward is represented on Stockport Council by three councillors:, Will Dawson (Lib Dem), Wendy Meikle (Lib Dem), and Oliver Harrison (Lib Dem).

 indicates seat up for re-election.
 indicates councillor defected.

Elections in the 2010s

May 2019

May 2018

May 2016
Laura Booth left Labour in 2014 and joined the Lib Dems in 2015 and rejoined Labour in 2018

May 2015

May 2014

May 2012
Laura Booth left Labour in 2014 and joined the Lib Dems in 2015. She was re-elected as the Lib Dem councillor for Offerton in 2016.

May 2011

References

External links
Stockport Metropolitan Borough Council

Wards of the Metropolitan Borough of Stockport